Marjorie Esther Ziff  (née Morrison; born 26 May 1929) is an English philanthropist recognized for her contributions to the Jewish community in Leeds. She was the wife of businessperson and philanthropist Arnold Ziff.

Career 
Marjorie has supported many local and international groups through charitable donations and is a trustee of the Marjorie and Arnold Ziff Charitable Foundation, founded in 1966. She is a life patron of the Leeds Jewish Welfare Board, and an honorary graduate and longstanding friend of the University of Leeds. Marjorie and her husband Arnold began supporting the Leeds International Piano Competition in 1981. Marjorie is the President of The Friends of Roundhay Park, a charitable organisation formed in 1994, which is dedicated to the preservation of Roundhay Park in Leeds. She has also acted as a representative for the Yorkshire Evening Post in local competitions and award ceremonies.

Buildings 

On 29 May 1964, her 35th birthday, Marjorie opened Merrion Centre, Leeds. In 2019, on the 55th anniversary of its opening, she returned there to open a month-long exhibition about the building. The Centre has frequently been used as a location for the local school Variety Club in order to benefit disabled and disadvantaged students.

In 2005, the Marjorie and Arnold Ziff Community Centre was opened in Moortown in recognition of their contributions made to the Jewish community in Leeds.

In 2006, the University of Leeds announced that the Marjorie and Arnold Ziff Building would be funded by a substantial donation from the family foundation and businesses, in memory of Arnold Ziff, who had died in 2004. In 2009, Marjorie opened this building, on her 80th birthday.

In 2007, Leeds Art Gallery was refurbished and the Queen's Gallery was renamed the Arnold and Marjorie Ziff Gallery in recognition of their patronage of the arts.
 
In July 2008, Tropical World in Leeds was renamed The Arnold and Marjorie Ziff Tropical World to recognise their financial contribution.

Personal life 
Marjorie and Arnold Ziff were married for 52 years and had three children together, called Ann, Michael and Edward.

Honours and recognition 
She received an MBE in the 2011 New Year Honours for her services to the community in Leeds.

In 2011 Frances Segelman, known for her sculptures of celebrities, made a bronze sculpture of Ziff.

The University of Leeds awarded Ziff an honorary doctorate of laws (LL.D.) on 14 July 2005, describing her as "a staunch supporter of the city" and "a longstanding supporter and friend of the University".

References 

1929 births
Living people
People from Leeds
English Jews
Jewish women philanthropists
Jewish British philanthropists
English women philanthropists 
English philanthropists
Members of the Order of the British Empire